Lonely Fifteen (靚妹仔, Leng mooi jai) is a 1982 Hong Kong film directed by David Lai.

Cast

Becky Lam 
Irene Wan
 Mak Tak-who
 John Au 
 Chung-Lung Chan 
 Hsing-Tang Chen
 Chu Fung Cheng
 Ging Cheung 
 Kar Lok Chin
 Shing-Choi Chu
 Yee Chui
 Shiu-Mei Fung
 Kwok Wing Ha 
 Yue-Keung Ho
 Yu Lung Hsiao
 Siu-Fong Lai 
 Wan Lee 
 Mei-King Leung
 Chi Ling 
 Ying Hong Luk 
 Wang Ban Poon 
 Bo Sha
 Ching-Mei Sham 
 Pui-Fong So
 Sam Sorono
 Kwai-Hing Suen
 Kam Bo Wong
 Manfred Wong
 Mei-Ling Wu 
 Koon-Jip Yip
 Sau-yee Yung

Reception

Awards
2nd Hong Kong Film Awards
 Won: Best Actress - Becky Lam
 Nominated: Best Film
 Nominated: Best Director - David Lai
 Nominated: Best Screenplay - Manfred Wong
 Nominated: Best New Performer - Irene Wan
 Nominated: Best Cinematography - Tong Bo-Sang Bob Thompson
 Nominated: Best Film Editing - Mak Family Editing Group

References

External links
 
 Art House: Lonely Fifteen started a trend in 'bad girl' movies

Hong Kong drama films
1982 films
Films directed by David Lai
1980s Hong Kong films